The Brilliant Book is a British television show for children.

It follows Benjamin, a nine-year-old boy, who has autism, and charts his and his friends' adventures. The show comes in 30-minute episodes, each of which are "loosely based on a letter of the alphabet". It has animated segments and film clips of Benjamin and his friends; each day Benjamin adds an adventure to his "brilliant book".

The show is created by Rhonda Merrick, a US native who lives in Britain; she also does the animations. The "Benjamin" of the show is her own son Benjamin.

References

Autism in television
Autism in the United Kingdom
British children's television series